Acton Park is a small town and agricultural district located in the South West of Western Australia inland from Busselton along Jalbarragup Road. It was established as part of the Group Settlement Scheme in the 1920s and the local hall was constructed in 1924. The area was gazetted as a bounded locality in 1987. At the 2021 Australian census the area had a population of 92.

References

Towns in Western Australia
South West (Western Australia)